Aleksandrovo, formerly known as Velike Livade, is a village in Serbia. It is situated in the Nova Crnja municipality, Central Banat District, Vojvodina province. The population of the village numbering 2,665 people (2002 census), of whom 2,435 (91.36%) are ethnic Serbs.

Name

Historical population
1961: 4,034
1971: 3,406
1981: 3,061
1991: 2,902

See also
List of places in Serbia
List of cities, towns and villages in Vojvodina

References
Slobodan Ćurčić, Broj stanovnika Vojvodine, Novi Sad, 1996.

Populated places in Serbian Banat